= Louis Walton Sipley =

American photographer (1897–1968)

Louis Walton Sipley (April 10, 1897 - October 18, 1968) was a writer, inventor museum proprietor and an author of books on photography. His museum's collection of photographs and his papers were donated to the George Eastman Museum which has a collection and conservation center named for him. The museum of photography he established was the first of its kind. He also created a hall of fame at it for photography innovators and pioneers.

He was part of the Bucknell University class of 1918.

With his wife Alice Gertrude Moïse (May 24, 1906 - April 26, 2003), he directed the American Museum of Photography in Philadelphia.

A collection of his work and papers was donated to the George Eastman Museum by 3M in 1977.

He reviewed an art book.

He is buried in a Jewish cemetery.

== Bibliography ==
- A half century of color by Louis Walton Sipley (1951)
- Photography's great inventors by Louis Walton Sipley (1965)
- A collector's guide to American photography by Louis Walton Sipley (1957)
- The photomechanical halftone by Louis Walton Sipley (1958)
- Frederic E. Ives, photo-graphic-arts inventor by Louis Walton Sipley (1956)
- Paintings by later American artists by Louis Walton Sipley (1939)
- Mempirs of a Photochemist written by Fritz Wentzel and edited by Sipley
- Pennsylvania Arts and Sciences (editor)
